Events from the year 1610 in Ireland.

Incumbent
 Monarch: James I

Events
 Plantations of Ireland in the north of County Wexford, on lands confiscated from the MacMurrough-Kavanagh clan; and in County Cavan by William Bailie, who begins construction of Bailieborough Castle, and Stephen Butler, who begins establishment of an urban centre at Belturbet.
 Construction of Antrim Castle is begun.
 Poet and historian Geoffrey Keating (Seathrún Céitinn) is appointed by the Catholic Church to the cure of souls at Uachtar Achaidh in the parish of Knockgraffon, near Cahir, County Tipperary.
 Barnabe Rich publishes A New Description of Ireland.

Births
 October 19 – James Butler, 1st Duke of Ormonde, Anglo-Irish statesman and soldier (d. 1688)
 Bonaventure Baron, Franciscan theologian (d. 1696)
 John Bathe, Jesuit (d. 1649)
 Guildford Slingsby, politician (d. 1643)

Deaths
 Approximate date – Patrick Walsh, merchant, ambassador and friar (b. before 1580)

References

 
1610s in Ireland
Ireland
Years of the 17th century in Ireland